The CAMit 2200 is an Australian lightweight four-stroke, 4-cylinder, horizontally-opposed air-cooled aircraft engine. Direct drive and using a solid-lifter valvetrain, the 2200 develops  at 3300rpm.

The engine was manufactured by CAMit Pty Ltd, of Bundaberg, Queensland, Australia. CAMit has manufactured engines for Jabiru since the Italian-sourced engines used by Jabiru became unavailable in 1991.  After receiving requests for and producing aftermarket Jabiru engine parts, CAMit went on to produce whole engines incorporating these modifications in late 2013.

Many parts are interchangeable with the original components from the Jabiru 2200 engine. However, in terms of component design, lubrication, valve train operation and metallurgy, the CAE engine is a completely different motor to a Jabiru.

The CAMit series of engines are classed as Experimental. Each serial number includes 'SLRE', designating 'Solid-Lifter Revised Experimental'.

CAMit Pty Ltd ceased operations and was placed in receivership in October 2016.

Results of R&D program 
 Improved crankcase sealing, and the addition of piston cooling jets
 The use of CAE-design 7/16" thru bolts
 25+ modifications to the heads, including use of an improved alloy
 Modified barrels: 10+ modifications, including thicker base flanges, improved honing process, and the reversal of piston orientation
 Improved flywheel coupling - lessens the chance of failure through various modifications
 Belt-driven 40A and 15A alternators to help damp the flywheel and provide charging at idle
 Redesigned rocker arms
 Modified oil cooler adaptor (TOCA also available)
 Breather/oil separator (see photo; device connected to rear end of black hose)
 Redesigned, easy to read oil dipstick
 Honda ignition coils, lifters, and starter clutches are used
 Ignition lead sets are assembled in-house
 CAE-design collectors and twin-exhaust system
A number of accessories were sold to complement both CAE and Jabiru engines.
 CHT Sensors
 TOCA (Thermostatic Oil Cooler Adaptor) - blocks off oil passage to cooler until engine is at temperature
 Digital tachometer sensor
 Engine inhibitor system - allows longer storage while preventing bore rust from occurring. Can be applied from the pilot's seat, just on shutdown.

CAE not subject to CASA restrictions 
In December 2014, the Australian Civil Aviation Safety Authority (CASA) imposed restrictions on all aircraft powered by Jabiru engines "in response to power-related problems involving engines manufactured by Jabiru Aircraft Pty Ltd (Jabiru)". It was stated in Sport Pilot magazine shortly after this that "the CAMIT [sic] engine is not subject to the Jabiru operational limitations described in 292/14, because the engine is not manufactured by a person under licence from, or under a contract with, Jabiru."

As of July 1, 2016, these restrictions were lifted for "most Jabiru-powered aircraft in Australia. Stock Jabiru engines that are maintained in strict accordance with Jabiru service bulletins and maintenance instructions are no longer affected by the limitations, which were issued in late 2014."

Specifications 
Data from the manufacturer

See also
CAMit 3300

References

Boxer engines
2000s aircraft piston engines